{{DISPLAYTITLE:Rho2 Sagittarii}}

Rho2 Sagittarii (ρ2 Sagittarii) is a star in the zodiac constellation of Sagittarius. With an apparent visual magnitude of +5.87, it is near the lower limit of stars that can be seen with the naked eye. Based upon an annual parallax shift of 9.82 mas as seen from Earth, it is located around 330 light years from the Sun.

This is an evolved K-type giant star with a stellar classification of K0 III. As a result of a 1997 lunar occultation, a companion star was discovered at an angular separation of 21 mas. It appears to be an A-type main sequence star with a class of around A5. This companion was not detected during prior occultations by the Moon.

References

K-type giants
Double stars
Sagittarii, Rho
Sagittarius (constellation)
Durchmusterung objects
Sagittarii, 45
181645
95188
7344